Jartavius "Quan" Martin (born April 17, 2000) is an American football safety for the Illinois Fighting Illini.

Early life and high school career
Martin grew up in Lehigh Acres, Florida and attended Lehigh Senior High School. As a junior, he recorded 38 tackles and two interceptions. Martin was rated a three-star recruit and committed to play college football at Illinois over offers from Air Force, Iowa State, and Central Michigan.

College career
Martin moved to cornerback going into is freshman season at Illinois. He became a starter early in his first season with the team. Martin was moved back to safety during 2021 spring practices. He finished the season with 55 tackles, 3.5 tackles for loss, one interception, seven passes broken up, and one forced fumble. Martin opted to use the extra year of eligibility granted to college athletes in 2020 due to the COVID-19 pandemic and returned to Illinois for a fifth season.

References

External links
Illinois Fighting Illini bio

Living people
Players of American football from Florida
American football safeties
Illinois Fighting Illini football players
2000 births